Indonesia–Senegal relations was officially established on October 3, 1980. Indonesia recognizes Senegal's potential as its entrance to penetrate the West African market.  Indonesian government opened its embassy in Dakar since 1982, while Senegal embassy in Kuala Lumpur is also accredited to Indonesia.

History
During colonial rule both Léopold Sédar Senghor and Mohammad Hatta participated in the February 1927 Congress against Colonial Oppression and Imperialism, held in Brussels. This conference has been described as the 'intellectual father' of the Bandung Conference. Senghor would later describe the 1955 Bandung Conference was 'the most important event since the Renaissance'. Indonesian President Sukarno paid an official visit to Senegal (then still not independent) in 1959.

Trade
In October 31 to November 1, 2013, Indonesia has launched trade mission to Senegal and Gambia to promote Indonesian products. At least US$700 thousand trade deal was recorded during this trade mission. Senegal intends to buy two CN-235-220 planes from state aircraft manufacturer PT Dirgantara Indonesia. The bilateral trade volume between the two countries reached US$46.1 million in 2012, with trade balance heavily in favour to Indonesia with exports to Senegal valued at US$43 million. Indonesian exports to Senegal includes animal and vegetable oils, machinery, chemicals, garments and utensils.

Cooperations
Indonesia has expressed their commitment to increase the cooperation with Senegal in economic and trade, technical and agricultural sector. Other sectors that potential to be developed are infrastructures, industry, healthcare, and culture.

See also
 Foreign relations of Indonesia
 Foreign relations of Senegal

Notes

External links
 The Embassy of Indonesia in Dakar, Senegal

Senegal
Bilateral relations of Senegal